Eva Khachatryan (born December 13, 1990), is an Armenian actress. She is known for her roles as Nora on Full House (Armenian TV series), and "Rita" on "Brothers (Armenian TV series).

Filmography

External links

References

1990 births
Living people
Actresses from Yerevan
Armenian film actresses
21st-century Armenian actresses
Armenian stage actresses